This is a list of episodes of the Japanese tokusatsu television drama Kamen Rider Blade. It is the fourteenth installment in the Kamen Rider series and is a joint collaboration between Ishimori Productions and Toei. The series was preceded by Kamen Rider 555 and succeeded by Kamen Rider Hibiki. The plot centers on a group of people, known as "Kamen Riders", that protect humans from creatures known as the "Undead". The four Kamen Riders are portrayed by Takayuki Tsubaki, Kousei Amano, Ryōji Morimoto, and Takahiro Hojo. Kamen Rider Blade originally aired in Japan on Sunday mornings at 8:00 AM on the TV Asahi channel from January 25, 2004 to January 23, 2005. The series has also aired in the Philippines and South Korea. Each episode lasted approximately 23–25 minutes. The episodes were later released on DVD by Toei. Twelve volumes were released with the first eleven having four episodes per DVD and the twelfth volume with five episodes. Related titles include a theatrical release, Kamen Rider Blade: Missing Ace released on September 11, 2004, and a V-cinema release, Kamen Rider Blade: Blade vs. Blade.

Episodes

DVD releases

References

External links
Official website from TV Asahi
Official website from Toei TV

Episodes
Blade